Cathay Bank is an American bank founded in 1962.

Cathay is headquartered in Chinatown, Los Angeles, with a corporate center in nearby El Monte, California.  It has branches in California, Massachusetts, New York, Texas, Washington, Illinois, New Jersey, Nevada, Maryland, and Hong Kong. Additionally, it has representative offices in Shanghai, Beijing and Taipei.

History 
Fung Chow Chan (Mar 1, 1909–Jan 29, 2001), emigrated from Guangdong to Los Angeles in 1933 to join his father's silk business and founded the Phoenix Bakery in Chinatown with his wife Wai Hing in 1938; the success of the bakery's strawberry cream cake, developed by his brother Lun, allowed him to be one of the first Asian Americans to integrate the Silver Lake neighborhood. However, he was denied a home loan because he was an immigrant, which spurred him to organize local community leaders and apply for a bank charter. Initial attempts to open a savings and loan were denied repeatedly by state regulators, so the group of investors he led instead applied for a commercial bank charter, receiving it on May 5, 1961 and Cathay Bank started operations in 1962, the first bank owned and operated primarily by Chinese-Americans to serve their community in Southern California. Chan's fellow founders were George T.M. Ching, Gerald T. Deal, Dr. Tin Y. Kwong, John R. MacFaden, Thomas Quon, and John F. Varela. Chan would also help found East West Bank in 1973, which received its charter on June 20, 1972.

Chan hired Eugene Kinn Choy, an architect responsible for many prominent buildings in Chinatown, to design the new bank's headquarters, which opened in 1966 at 777 N Broadway. The International Modern building incorporates the cultural heritage of its founders in the shape of the roof and the four Chinese characters running down the facade. In 1979 it opened its first branch office in Monterey Park. Its first overseas representative office in Hong Kong was opened in 1985.

In 1999, Cathay expanded beyond California by opening a loan production office in Houston, Texas, which was converted to a full-service branch in 2000. Expansion to New York occurred in 1999 with the acquisition of certain assets of Golden City Commercial Bank. The Cathay Bank Foundation was established in 2002 to create opportunities for affordable housing, community and economic development, and education.

In 2003, branch offices were opened in Boston, Massachusetts, and Kent, Washington. Cathay merged with General Bank in 2003. In 2006, Cathay prevailed in a bidding war with United Commercial Bank to acquire Great Eastern Bank. Cathay also acquired New Asia Bank in 2006.

On March 31, 2006, announced plans to acquire a 20% stake in First Sino Bank, but the deal fell through because the companies failed to get approval from the Chinese government. On March 30, 2007, Cathay expanded into New Jersey when it completed its acquisition of United Heritage Bank.

In 2007, Cathay Bank converted its Hong Kong Representative office into a full-service branch.

On January 21, 2015, Cathay General Bancorp, the holding company for Cathay Bank, and Asia Bancshares, the holding company for Asia Bank, N.A., announced that they had entered into a definitive agreement for the merger of Asia Bancshares into Cathay. The result of the merger increased Cathay Bank's presence in New York as well as added Maryland to its list of service areas.

On July 8, 2016, Cathay announced plans to acquire Far East National Bank.

On May 26, 2021, Cathay entered into an agreement with HSBC Bank USA, N.A. to purchase HSBC's retail operations on the West Coast, including 10 branches in Washington and California. Under the agreement, Cathay will acquire approximately $1.0 billion in deposits and approximately $800 million in loans.

Acquisitions 
 First Public Savings Bank (1996)
 Lippo Bank's Westminster branch (1997)
 Certain assets of Golden City Commercial Bank in New York (1999)
 General Bank (2003)
 Great Eastern Bank (2006)
 New Asia Bank (2006)
 United Heritage Bank (2007)
 Asia Bank, N.A. (2015)
 Far East National Bank (2017)

See also 
 List of S&P 400 companies

References

External links 

 Cathay Bank
 
 
 

American companies established in 1962
Banks established in 1962
Banks based in California
Companies based in Los Angeles
Chinese American banks
Chinese-American culture in Los Angeles
Companies listed on the Nasdaq

sah:Cathay Bank